The Garbage Chronicles is a novel written by Brian Herbert and published in 1985.

Plot summary
The Garbage Chronicles is a novel about Captain Jarvik.

Reception
Neil Gaiman reviewed The Garbage Chronicles for Imagine magazine, and stated that "one of the worst books I've read in years - it may have been meant to be funny, but I could well be wrong - and should be avoided as you would a rabid dog with a Cruise misile."

References

1985 American novels